Bob Kushell is an American television writer and producer.  He has written for network television comedies including The Simpsons, 3rd Rock from the Sun, Malcolm in the Middle, Grounded For Life, American Dad!, Samantha Who?, Suburgatory, Anger Management, and FAM. In 2015, Kushell joined Bill Prady to co-create The Muppets, which ran for 1 season on  ABC Television and won a Nickelodeon Kids' Choice Award. 

Kushell has been nominated for two primetime Emmy Awards and won a Golden Globe.  Paley Center for Media has preserved the first season Salute Your Shorts episode "Sponge Saga" in its New York archive, which had its teleplay written by Kushell. 

Kushell is also the creator and writer of Way to Go, a comedy series for the UK's BBC Three about three men who start an assisted suicide business. It was first commissioned by the BBC in November 2012.

In December 2008 he hosted his own online talk show, co-created with his brother-in-law Russell Arch, Anytime with Bob Kushell, on Crackle.  The show was a fully featured talk show in five minutes, including a one-joke monologue, a comedy bit and an interview with a celebrity guest.  The show ran for two seasons.

References

External links

http://www.tv.com/people/bob-kushell/
http://www.emmys.com/nominations/1997
http://www.emmys.com/nominations/1998
https://web.archive.org/web/20130521182756/http://www.goldenglobes.org/browse/?param=%2Fyear%2F1996

Living people
Place of birth missing (living people)
Year of birth missing (living people)
American television writers
American male television writers
American television producers